The Hits Southern Lakes is an adult contemporary radio station in Queenstown, New Zealand.

Craig "Ferg" Ferguson hosts an entertaining local morning show on the station from 6.00am to 9.00am weekdays.

References

Southern Lakes
Queenstown, New Zealand